John Stephen (1780 – July 26, 1844) was a Maryland public official and judge who served as a justice of the Maryland Court of Appeals from 1822 to 1844.

Biography
Born in St. Mary's County, Maryland to the Rev. John Stephen, minister of All Faith's Church, Stephen was elected to the Maryland House of Delegates for Baltimore City from 1804 to 1805. On March 17, 1806, President Thomas Jefferson nominated Stephen to serve as United States Attorney for the District of Maryland. Stephen resigned from that office in 1810, and thereafter served as a Member of Governors' Council from 1810 to 1811, and as a member of the Maryland Senate representing the Western Shore from 1812 to 1815. He lived in Annapolis from 1817 to 1818, and again served on the Governors' Council from 1819 to 1820, and in the Maryland Senate in 1821.

In 1822, Stephen was named to the Maryland Court of Appeals, where he remained until his death in 1844. He was described as a "learned and able jurist" who "obtained a high reputation as a judge".

Personal life and death

Stephen married Juliana J. Brice, daughter of Colonel James Brice, on November 1, 1808. They resided at Stephen's estate, called "Bostwick", in Bladensburg, Prince George's County, and they had eight sons.

Stephen died in Annapolis, Maryland, at about age 64.

References

1780 births
1844 deaths
People from St. Mary's County, Maryland
United States Attorneys for the District of Maryland
Members of the Maryland House of Delegates
Maryland state senators
Judges of the Maryland Court of Appeals